The FAM214B, also known as protein family with sequence similarity 214, B (FAM214B) is a protein that, in humans, is encoded by the FAM214B gene located on the human chromosome 9. The protein has 538 amino acids. The gene contain 9 exon. There has been studies that there are low expression of this gene in patients with major depression disorder. In most organisms such as mammals, amphibians, reptiles, and birds, there are high levels of gene expression in the bone marrow and blood. For humans in fetal development, FAM214B is mostly expressed in the brains and bone marrow.

Gene

Aliases 
This is also known as KIAA1539, BA182N22.6, FLJ11560, PI.11659_5, LOC80256, and RP11-182N22.6.

Location 
FAM214B is located on human chromosome 9 at the locus position 9p13.3. The gene is 12,229 bp long and it is at position 35,104,112 bp to the 35,116,341 on chromosome 9.

Transcript variants 
There are currently 2 mRNA transcripts variants of FAM214B. Variant 1 encodes the longest transcript and Variant 2 differs in the 5' UTR.

Protein

Isoforms 
There are currently 2 isoforms for FAM214B protein, where isoform 1 encodes for Variant 1 for the longest protein and isoform 2 encoded by Variant 2.

Composition and characteristics 
The FAM214B protein has a predicted molecular weight of 56.7 kDa and has an isometric point of 9.1. For protein composition, the FAM214B protein contains high amounts of Glycine and Proline, while there was a lack of Isoleucine. There were clusters of positively charged regions on amino acid position 308 to 327 which composed of mostly Leucine and Arginine. There was a repetitive structure of amino acids GPGLG repeat on amino acid position 82 to 86, and 106 to 110. There were repeats of amino acids of Proline in position 10 to 25, and 225 to 265.

Protein Domain 
The FAM214B contains a DUF4210 domain of unknown function at the position 348 to 402, and a chromosome segregation domain at position 480 to 536. The DUF4210 domain is currently has unknown function and predicted to be necessary for chromosome segregation in meiosis.

Secondary structure 
Using Phyre2, Ali2D, and I-TASSER predicted that the FAM214B secondary structure composed of mostly beta sheets and one alpha helix. Phyre2 prediction is shown on the right.

Tertiary Structure 
Tertiary Structure was predicted using I-Tasser where the purple represents the C-terminal and the red represents the N-terminal shown on the right.

Post-translation modifications

Phosphorylation 
There are 7 predicted phosphorylation sites on the FAM214B protein which consists of mostly serine and threonine residues.

Sub-cellular localization 
Studies of FAM214B protein was determined that the protein is localized in the nucleus.

Expression and regulation

Promoters 

Using the Genomatix Gene2Promoter tool, it was determined that the FAM214B has 5 promoters that are found in Homo sapiens. The promoter GXP_38326 has the highest number of encoded transcripts which spans on position 35115811 to 35116911 on the negative strand of human chromosome 9.

Transcription factors 

The table represents a list of predicted transcription factors that bind to the GXP_9003729 promoter using Genomatix MatInspector tool.

Expression

Tissue Specific Expression 
The RNA-Seq data from NCBI gene and The Human Atlas Protein shows that the FAM214B is highly expressed in the bone marrow, placenta, esophagus, and the brain such as corpus callosum, pons and medulla, and spinal cord.

Embryonic development 
An in-situ hybridization technique has been conducted on mouse embryos that shows high levels of FAM214B transcript in the hippocampus and neocortex.

Differential expression 
There has been numerous experiments on levels of expression for FAM214B. Patients with diabetic nephropathy express higher levels of FAM214B gene than those who are normal. Patients with bipolar disorders expressed higher levels of FAM214B in the orbitofrontal cortex than those who are normal. Patients with allergic nasal epithelium responses to house dust mites have lower expression of FAM214B than those who did not have allergies to house mites.

3'UTR 

There are 9 stem loops and miRNAs that bind to FAM214B transcript 3'UTR shown on the right.

Interacting proteins 

A list of proteins that interact with FAM214B in IntAct and UniProt database.

Homology and evolution

Orthologs and paralogs 
FAM214B has orthologs in Mammalia, Aves, Reptilia, Amphibia, Actinopterygii, Arthropodas, Ascomycota, Zygomycota, and Plantae. There is one paralog that is FAM214A. The FAM214A protein has 1076 amino acids and is located on chromosome 13.

Evolutionary history 

The most distant species relating to humans was Mikania micrantha which was about 1496 MYA. The most closely related relative for this gene found in mammals comparing to humans was the mouse which was dated about 90 MYA. The FAM214B is conserved in Eukaryota. In terms of the molecular clock analysis, it seems that FAM214B has evolved quicker than Cytochrome c but much slower than Fibrinogen alpha.

Studies of clinical significance 
There are studies that show the gene expression of KIAA1539 in patients with major depression disorders by using biomarkers to detect vulnerability to recurrent depression. Low expression of this gene was common in patients who have MDD and was significantly difference than those who did not have MDD. Experiments were conducted in patients with major depression disorders by using biomarkers to detect vulnerability to recurrent depression and is expressed in patients with depressive disorders before and after cognitive behavioral therapy.

References 

Uncharacterized proteins